Lucienne Moreau (17 February 1933 – 16 January 2022) was a French actress.

Biography
For most of her professional career, Moreau served as a security guard. In 1992, she moved to Argenteuil and, in 2000, responded to a newspaper advertisement for taking pictures. She was then offered more roles from advertisers and built up an acting résumé. She joined a marketing agency for seniors called Masters Models as well as the publicity agency Leg. Thanks to these agencies, she was able to acquire roles in advertising for the likes of Eurostar.

Moreau went on to appear in roles in television and film, such as those on Groland and Le Petit Journal, in which she had her own segment titled "The Lucienne Live Report". In December 2010, she participated in David Ken's , disguised as Mrs. Claus. During the 2010 Christmas holiday, she held a segment on Le Petit Journal titled " Lucienne a lu", alongside Yann Barthès. Throughout the 2010s, she took on many roles in advertising campaigns and became known for such appearances.

Lucien Moreau died in Paris on 16 January 2022, at the age of 88.

Filmography

Cinema
Who Killed Bambi? (2003)
 (2017)
Rolling to You (2018)

Television
 (1992)
Le Kad & O Show (2001)
H (2002)
Le Petit Journal (2010–2011)
Les Lolies (2014)

Short films
Les Petits Hommes vieux (2005)
Je suis un chic type (2011)
Mamie Mia ! (2012)
 (2012)
Je suis off (2016)
En tout bien (2018)

Advertisements
Cetelem (2010)
Institute of Internet and Multimedia (2011)
 (2011)
 (2012)
/Crédit Mutuel (2012)
Eurostar (2013)
L'Oréal (2013)
Ministry of Finance (2014)
Café Grand-mère (2018)

References

1933 births
2022 deaths
French film actresses
French television actresses
People from Mayenne
21st-century French actresses